Leigh Reservoir, or Leigh Hill Reservoir, is a small reservoir in Somerset, England.
It was built in 1893 to supply water to the town of Taunton, Somerset, which lies to the north.
Water quality is good.

Location

Leigh Reservoir is an artificial lake in the parish of Pitminster, Somerset,  from the sea.
It is to the west of Luxhay Reservoir and south of the village of Lowton, near to Angersleigh.
The reservoir is near the southern boundary of the River Tone catchment basin.

Description

It was to contain .
The reservoir was built by Bond & Hitchcock, contractors.
It was operated by the Taunton Waterworks.

Leigh and Luxhay reservoirs are managed today by Wessex Water.
In 2013 Wessex Water arranged for installation of physical and electronic security systems in both reservoirs, using a system of pontoons during installation.
Leigh Reservoir is accessed via a single entry point on top.
A secure access cover was installed, enclosed in a high security cage.

Water quality

During the Routine Monitoring Programme of 1990 the reservoir was listed as containing "abundant" blue-green algae.
No bloom or scum were observed, although there was scum on Luxhay Reservoir.
Leigh Reservoir is one of three in the Tone catchment that are monitored under the EC Surface Water Abstraction Directive, the others being the Clatworthy Reservoir and Luxhay Reservoir.
A 1998 report said that none of these reservoirs had exceeded the standard for dissolved and emulsified hydrocarbons since UV fluorescence tests began in September 1997.
As of 2015 water quality was good both chemically and ecologically.

Notes

Sources

External links

Reservoirs in Somerset
1893 establishments in England